Keigan Parker (born 8 June 1982) is a Scottish footballer who plays for West of Scotland League Central District First Division Thorniewood United as a forward.

Career
Parker was a "relatively late starter" in the game, beginning at around the age of 14. A year or so later, he began playing for Muirieston United in Livingston. He then joined Hutchison Vale Boys Club.

St Johnstone
Parker, a striker, began his career at age 15 with Scottish club St Johnstone, where he made a promising start to his career (making his debut against Motherwell aged 16) and was being tipped by many to have a big future. While at St Johnstone, he gained one cap for the Scotland U-21 team. Unable to impress enough at McDiarmid Park, and after being out for six months with a foot injury, in 2004, after six years in Perth, he joined Blackpool on a free transfer.

Blackpool
Parker was the first signing made by then Blackpool manager Colin Hendry in June 2004. He made his début for the club on 7 August 2004 as a substitute in a 2–0 defeat at Doncaster Rovers and made his starting début three days later in a 2–1 defeat at home to Sheffield Wednesday. His first goal came on 29 September in a 2–0 win over York City. In December 2004 he scored a second-half hat-trick at Bloomfield Road against Torquay United.

With Blackpool, Parker found some consistency while the club were in League One but failed to hold down a place in the side when they were promoted to The Championship in the 2007–08 season. He made his 100th league appearance for Blackpool on 30 December 2006, in a 3–1 win over Doncaster Rovers at Bloomfield Road.

On 27 May 2007, Parker scored Blackpool's second goal in their 2–0 win against Yeovil Town in the League One play-off final at Wembley, a result that promoted Blackpool to The Championship. "It's the best day of my career," he said afterwards. "I've scored against Celtic and Rangers before, but to win at Wembley is something I'll treasure for the rest of my life." It was also his last goal for the club.

Parker finished the 2006–07 season as the club's second-top scorer with sixteen goals in all competitions. He failed to secure a regular place in the starting line-up in the 2007–08 season and in the January 2008 transfer window, he rejected a move to Barnsley. His last appearance for the club came on 15 March 2008 against local rivals Preston North End and on 7 May, he was released by Blackpool. He had not featured in the first team during the final two months of the 2007–08 season and had made just 17 appearances for the club throughout the season, failing to score a goal. "The last three months have been a bit of a nightmare," he explained at the time. "I've had four great years and last season was fantastic, especially at Wembley, but I'll be moving on in the summer." On 15 May 2008, Parker stated that he was not released by Blackpool, that he had turned down the offer of a new contract earlier in the season and had then allowed his existing deal to run out. He was linked with moves to Huddersfield Town, Swansea City, Scottish Premier League club Aberdeen and Southampton, with Parker saying, "There are five or six clubs who are interested. It depends on a few issues but I should know more in the next couple of weeks."

English career after leaving Blackpool
On 27 May 2008, Parker agreed to join Huddersfield Town on a two-year contract, subject to a medical. His first appearance for Town came in their 4–0 win against Bradford City on 12 August 2008, when he played the final ten minutes of the match. His first league appearance was again as a substitute in a 3–1 defeat to Milton Keynes Dons on 23 August. His first league goal came on 1 November, to give Huddersfield a 3–2 victory over Crewe Alexandra at the Galpharm Stadium. He was sent off in added time for two yellow cards. His first away goal for the club came in the 4–2 defeat by Leicester City on 24 January 2009.

On 2 March 2009, Parker joined fellow Football League One side Hartlepool United on loan after being locked out of the Town side by new loan signing Lukas Jutkiewicz and Danny Cadamarteri amongst others. He made his debut the following day in the 2–1 win against Tranmere Rovers at Victoria Park but failed to score in nine starts and returned to Huddersfield.

On 21 July 2009, Parker agreed a one-year deal at Oldham Athletic, which was completed the following day. On 18 March 2010, Parker was loaned for a month-long to Football League Two club Bury. After returning to Oldham Athletic after his loan spell, Parker was released from his contract in line with close-season streamlining at the club.

After being released by Oldham Athletic, Parker signed for Mansfield Town on 20 July 2010 and was unveiled to the Mansfield fans before their pre-season friendly match against local rivals Nottingham Forest. He then went on loan to Fleetwood Town and scored on his debut against Grimsby Town.

In August 2011, he joined Stockport County but was released on 25 August. Following his release from Stockport, Parker joined North West Counties League Premier Division club AFC Blackpool in September 2011. Parker joined Northern Premier League Division One North club AFC Fylde in September 2011 just days after signing for AFC Blackpool, scoring 13 goals in 28 games for the Coasters.

Ayr United
On 1 February 2012 Parker joined Scottish First Division side Ayr United on a free transfer from Fylde. Parker made his début for Ayr United on 11 February 2012 in a Scottish First Division match against Queen of the South. Parker scored his first goal for the Honest Men against Partick Thistle at Firhill, United lost 4–2.
On Saturday 28 April Parker scored 2 goals in a 3 – 2 victory for Ayr over high flying Dundee. His second goal of that game, a spectacular overhead kick, was voted goal of the season across the three divisions of the SFL.

Cork City
Parker signed for Cork City in July 2012. He made his League of Ireland home debut against Shelbourne on 27 July 2012, coming on as a 70th-minute substitute, only to get a straight red card 15 minutes later.

Later career
Parker signed for Junior side Irvine Meadow in late October 2012 and was released on 28 February 2013. Parker then signed for Junior side Shettleston on 1 March 2013. Parker signed for Airdrie on 2 January 2014 after appearing as a trialist and scoring the winning goal against Arbroath. He was released by the club in February 2015.

On 2 February 2015, Parker signed for Clyde on a six-month contract, after being released by Airdrieonians earlier the same day. Parker made his debut alongside Scott McLaughlin in a 2–0 win over Albion Rovers at Cliftonhill assisting the second goal. Parker was released from Clyde in May 2015 after failing to earn a new contract.

Parker signed for West Lancashire League club Wyre Villa in 2016. He scored two goals on his debut, a 4–1 win over Dalton United. On 19 January 2017, Parker signed for Scottish Junior Club Thorniewood United until the end of the season.

As of April 2021, he had also been working in sales for several years.

Honours
Blackpool
Football League One play-off final winner: 2006–07

References

External links
Keigan Parker profile at Vital Hartlepool
Keigan Parker player profile at htafc.com
Keigan Parker player profile at blackpoolfc.co.uk

1982 births
Living people
Footballers from West Lothian
Sportspeople from Livingston, West Lothian
Association football forwards
Scottish footballers
Scotland under-21 international footballers
Lothian Thistle Hutchison Vale F.C. players
St Johnstone F.C. players
Blackpool F.C. players
Huddersfield Town A.F.C. players
Hartlepool United F.C. players
Oldham Athletic A.F.C. players
Bury F.C. players
Mansfield Town F.C. players
Fleetwood Town F.C. players
Stockport County F.C. players
A.F.C. Blackpool players
AFC Fylde players
Ayr United F.C. players
Cork City F.C. players
Irvine Meadow XI F.C. players
Glasgow United F.C. players
Airdrieonians F.C. players
Clyde F.C. players
Scottish Premier League players
Scottish Football League players
Scottish Junior Football Association players
Scottish Professional Football League players
English Football League players
National League (English football) players
League of Ireland players